

Æthelwold II was a medieval Bishop of Winchester. He was consecrated between 1006 and 1007. He died between 1012 and 1013.

Citations

References

External links
 

Bishops of Winchester
11th-century English Roman Catholic bishops

10th-century births
1010s deaths
Year of birth unknown
Year of death uncertain